Colonel William Assheton Harbord, 2nd Baron Suffield (21 August 1766 – 1 August 1821), was a Member of Parliament for Ludgershall (1790–1796) and  Plympton Erle (7 February 1807 – 4 February 1810). He was colonel of a fencible cavalry regiment, the Norfolk Fencible Light Dragoons (1794), the Blickling Rifle Volunteers (1803), and East Norfolk Regiment of Militia (1808). He was an English amateur cricketer.

Biography
He was mainly associated with Marylebone Cricket Club (MCC). Harbord made three known appearances in first-class cricket matches during the 1791 season.

He succeeded his father, Harbord Harbord, 1st Baron Suffield, as Baron Suffield in February 1810. He married Lady Caroline Hobart, daughter of John Hobart, 2nd Earl of Buckinghamshire, but had no children. On his death, his title passed to his brother Edward.

He played an intermittent role in politics, being regarded as a strong if not vocal supporter of William Pitt the Younger and later of Spencer Perceval. Although he had a strong family link with Castlereagh, who had married Caroline's sister Lady Amelia Hobart, the two men were not close politically. He opposed the abolition of the slave trade in 1807.

Arms

Notes

References

Further reading

External links 
 

|-

1766 births
1821 deaths
English cricketers
English cricketers of 1787 to 1825
Lord-Lieutenants of Norfolk
Marylebone Cricket Club cricketers
Harbord, William Assheton
People from Middleton, Greater Manchester
Harbord, William Assheton
Suffield, B2
Members of the Parliament of Great Britain for English constituencies
British MPs 1790–1796
Surrey cricketers
William